"Do Me a Favor" is a song by American rock band Stone Sour, released on February 12, 2013 as the lead-off single from House of Gold & Bones – Part 2. It contains a reprise of "A Rumor of Skin" from the first part of the album.

Background 
Lead vocalist Corey Taylor suggested that while a single for "Part 2" would be the next release, there would still be more singles from "Part 1". He gave a preview of what to expect from the song: 

Taylor noted: 

Taylor also told:

Music video 
The animated video for "Do Me a Favor" was directed by Phil Mucci and was released through their official YouTube channel on March 27. Corey Taylor said that it features all the characters from the story: Human, Allen, Black John, Numbers and Peckinpah.

Track listing

Chart positions

References

Stone Sour songs
2013 singles
2013 songs
Roadrunner Records singles
Songs written by Corey Taylor
Songs written by Roy Mayorga
Songs written by Josh Rand
Songs written by Jim Root
Song recordings produced by David Bottrill